Miguel Antonio de Merlos (1669-c.1744) was a Spanish military man and politician, who served during the colonial period of Buenos Aires. He held various positions, including Sargento Mayor of the Compañía of Guardias Españolas and Governor of the province of Porco.

Biography 

Miguel Antonio de Merlos was baptized on January 20, 1669 in the Parish of Santa Eulalia, the son of Diego de Merlos y Calvo and Estefanía Jiménez de los Ríos, belonging to Spanish noble families from Murcia. He did his studies in Spain and arrived at the Río de la Plata as a passenger of Capt. Francisco de Retama in 1691. 

Installed in Buenos Aires, Merlos held various military and political positions, including as commander of the Fuerte de Buenos Aires. He also served as notary of the Real Asiento de Inglaterra, and held the position of Mayordomo of Buenos Aires in 1705 and 1740 (hierarchical position, concerning to managing the finances of the city).

His first public position in the Spanish domains of America was as governor of Porco (Potosí, Bolivia), appointed on September 15, 1708, during the viceroyalty of Manuel de Oms, 1st Marquis of Castelldosrius.

Family 
Miguel Antonio de Merlos was married in the Buenos Aires Cathedral to Rosa Martinez de Figueroa, daughter of Juan Martínez Guerrero and Leonor Ramírez de Arellano, belonging to an illustrious family of the Kingdom of Chile. He and his wife were the parents of Miguel Antonio de Merlos y Martínez, caballero of the Real Orden de Santiago, who served as alcalde of 2nd vote (vice-mayor) of Buenos Aires in 1735.

References

External links 
Matrimonios 1656-1762
Bautismos 1682-1713
Bautismos 1682-1713

1669 births
1740s deaths
People from Murcia
People from Buenos Aires
17th-century Spanish nobility
18th-century Spanish military personnel
Spanish colonial governors and administrators
18th-century Spanish nobility